Bay Hill is a census-designated place (CDP) in Orange County, Florida, United States. The population was 4,884 at the 2010 census. It is part of the Orlando–Kissimmee Metropolitan Statistical Area. The Bay Hill area is generally located on either side of Apopka-Vineland Road in southwest Orange County, north of Lake Buena Vista and south of Windermere.

Geography

Demographics

As of the census of 2000, there were 5,177 people, 1,786 households, and 1,500 families residing in the CDP.  The population density was 786.9/km2 (2,038.0/mi2).  There were 1,947 housing units at an average density of 296.0/km2 (766.5/mi2).  The racial makeup of the CDP was 85.11% White, 2.28% African American, 0.17% Native American, 9.52% Asian, 0.64% from other races, and 2.28% from two or more races. Hispanic or Latino of any race were 5.70% of the population.

There were 1,786 households, out of which 39.2% had children under the age of 18 living with them, 76.3% were married couples living together, 5.4% had a female householder with no husband present, and 16.0% were non-families. 12.4% of all households were made up of individuals, and 4.1% had someone living alone who was 65 years of age or older.  The average household size was 2.90 and the average family size was 3.17.

In the CDP, the population was spread out, with 26.5% under the age of 18, 5.6% from 18 to 24, 25.0% from 25 to 44, 32.2% from 45 to 64, and 10.8% who were 65 years of age or older.  The median age was 42 years. For every 100 females, there were 97.8 males.  For every 100 females age 18 and over, there were 96.0 males.

The median income for a household in the CDP was $99,894, and the median income for a family was $101,246. Males had a median income of $78,170 versus $38,889 for females. The per capita income for the CDP was $46,744.  About 3.8% of families and 4.3% of the population were below the poverty line, including 4.2% of those under age 18 and 2.7% of those age 65 or over.

Education
Residents are zoned to Orange County Public Schools.

Four elementary schools serve sections of Bay Hill: Palm Lake, Dr. Phillips Elementary, Bay Meadows, and Windermere. Most of Bay Hill is zoned to Southwest Middle School, while a section is zoned to Chain of Lakes Middle School. All residents are zoned to Dr. Phillips High School.

References

Census-designated places in Orange County, Florida
Greater Orlando
Census-designated places in Florida